Michael Ashwin Satyandre Adhin (born 10 June 1980) is a Surinamese educator, politician, and was the Vice President of Suriname between 2015 and 2020. He is a member of the National Democratic Party. At the age of 35, he became the youngest vice president in the history of Suriname to lead the Council of Ministers. Adhin is a Hindu of Indian descent.

In July 2013, Adhin became Minister of Education in the cabinet of President Dési Bouterse, replacing Shirley Sitaldin. After the 2015 Surinamese general election, in which Adhin was elected to the National Assembly for the electoral district of Paramaribo, he was inaugurated as vice president on 12 August 2015, and served until 16 July 2020. Adhin was succeeded by Ronnie Brunswijk.

Early life and career

Education 

Adhin obtained a BSc degree in Electrical Engineering (Information Technology) from the Anton de Kom University of Suriname (AdeKUS) in 2001, and subsequently a Dutch Engineers's degree (Ir.) in Electrical Engineering (Telecommunications) from the Delft University of Technology in 2004.

Before embarking on a political career, he served as an educator at the Anton de Kom University of Suriname.

Chair Cultural Union Suriname (CUS) 

In May 2011 Adhin was appointed the new chairman of the Cultural Union Suriname and remained onboard until February 2014. Adhin who has been active within social cultural organizations for the past 13 years, remains to place emphasis on the importance of the role of culture for development, consciousness creation, appreciation of one's heritage, and for stimulating the achievement of common goals through active and collective participation of individuals. It was his leadership qualities during the preparation of the 140 years Indian Immigration national festivities, which caught the attention of President Bouterse, who later on appointed him Minister of Education and Community Development in July 2013. Adhin has also been an active member of the Vishva Hindu Parishad Suriname and foundation Mata Gauri.

Minister of Education and Community Development 

From 2013 to 2015 Adhin served as Minister of Education and Community Development. He announced a total restructuring of the Ministry to improve the results within the education sector in Suriname.

Suriname National Training Authority 

In August 2013 Adhin launched the Technical Vocational Education and Training (TVET) method of education in Suriname. A taskforce was installed on November 1, 2013, to work towards the establishment of a National Training Authority making use of an existing Caricom strategy. This national authority was to be responsible for closing the gap between the education system and the demand of the private sector labor markets, the certification of various professions as well as the quality assurance of courses within the Suriname education system.

ICT in Education 

In October 2014 Adhin introduced two ICT in Education courses, amongst which a 3 years course leading to the Bachelor in Education (B.ed) degree. The courses are meant to target educators and are in line with Adhin's policy priorities to upgrade and professionalize the sector and to prepare for technological developments and challenges within education in general. He brought international professionals on board to realize the plans within a period of 4 months.

Pre-College Bridging Institute and Evening School 

In April 2015 Adhin officially launched the opening of Suriname's first pre-college Bridging Institute increasing the opportunities for more students to attend pre-college. The opening and launch of the Evening Pre-College also served the same purpose.

Young Entrepreneurship 
As minister of education Adhin created opportunities for young entrepreneurs to invest in themselves, with the establishment of the Suriname National Training Authority, as well as several ICT training courses.

Vice President of Suriname

Foreign policy

Relations with India 
On January 9, 2017, Vice President Adhin met with the Prime Minister of India, Narendra Modi, in Bengaluru, India, where they discussed strengthening the economic and technological bilateral cooperation between both states. Adhin emphasized that Suriname has a lot to of potential in the areas of agriculture, animal husbandry, palm oil, wood processing, besides those in the extractive industries (gold, crude oil and bauxite). Adhin's plans are to set up a chair on Ayurveda at the University of Suriname and National Institute for Natural and Holistic Therapies in collaboration with India. His plans include setting up medicinal plantations, research laboratories, factories to manufacture Ayurveda products for the Surinamese market and expanding to also cover the Latin American countries and Caribbean Islands. This vision of Adhin supports efforts to diversify the Surinamese economy but also the governments approach to make healthcare the most important priority. This latter is also emphasized by the Governments Health in All Policies (HIAP) programme.

As a young accomplished individual of Indian origin, Adhin was invited to India as keynote speaker at the Youth Privasi Bharatiya Divas Convention held on January 7, 2016, which was part of the annual Privasi Bharatiya Divas (PBD) Convention, a global platform for Indian Diaspora held from 8–9 January 2017 in Bengaluru, the capital of the state of Karnataka.

2020 Elections 
Adhin has been elected to the National Assembly in 2020 according to the official results. Adhin was not a candidate for the 2020 Vice Presidency, and no other candidates other than Brunswijk had been nominated as per 8 July 2020, 15:00 (UTC−3). Therefore Ronnie Brunswijk was elected as his successor on 13 July in an uncontested election. Adhin's term as vice president ended on 16 July 2020.

References

1980 births
Living people
Government ministers of Suriname
Members of the National Assembly (Suriname)
National Democratic Party (Suriname) politicians
Surinamese Hindus
Surinamese politicians
Surinamese people of Indian descent
Vice presidents of Suriname
Surinamese politicians of Indian descent